John Calverley was  an English Anglican priest in the 16th-century.

Calverley was educated at All Souls College, Oxford. He was appointed  Rector of Stone, Kent in 1559, and of Beckenham in 1561, and Cliffe in 1572. He was Archdeacon of Rochester from 1574 until his death two years later.

Notes

16th-century English people
Archdeacons of Rochester
Fellows of All Souls College, Oxford
1576 deaths